Ben Venue is a historic home and farm located near Washington, Rappahannock County, Virginia. The main house was built between 1844 and 1846, and is a three-story, five bay, brick dwelling with a side gable roof and parapets.  It features a one-story porch that covers the central three bays; it has four Doric order columns supporting a bracketed entablature.  The property also includes three brick slave cabins, the original Fletcher homestead, kitchen, smokehouse, privy, and a formal garden.

It was added to the National Register of Historic Places in 1979.

References

Washington, Virginia
Houses in Rappahannock County, Virginia
Houses completed in 1846
Farms on the National Register of Historic Places in Virginia
Historic district contributing properties in Virginia
Houses on the National Register of Historic Places in Virginia
National Register of Historic Places in Rappahannock County, Virginia
Slave cabins and quarters in the United States